Strohschab are Austrian costumes representing cockroaches. They are made of hay or straw and are used in Saint Nicholas parades.

References

Austrian culture
Costumes
Austrian clothing